In December 2014 the Mexican professional wrestling promotion Consejo Mundial de Lucha Libre (CMLL) held a total of three CMLL Super Viernes shows on Friday nights as the Friday December 5th slot was replaced with CMLL's major annual show Infierno en el Ring. Several of the Infierno en el Ring matches were as a direct result of matches on the previous months' Super Viernes shows. Some of the matches from Super Viernes were taped for CMLL's weekly shows that aired on television in Mexico in the following week. The Super Viernes events featured a varying number of professional wrestling matches, in which some wrestlers were involved in pre-existing scripted feuds or storylines and others were teamed up with no storyline reason as such. Wrestlers themselves portrayed either villains (referred to as "Rudos" in Mexico) or fan favorites ("Tecnicos" in Mexico) as they competed in matches with pre-determined outcomes that is not known to the general public ahead of time.

December 5, 2014
On December 5, 2014 CMLL held the 2014 version of the Infierno en el Ring show, replacing the regular Super Viernes show on Friday night.

December 12, 2014

Mexican professional wrestling, or Lucha libre, promotion Consejo Mundial de Lucha Libre (CMLL) held their 46th CMLL Super Viernes show of 2014 on December 26, 2014 in Arena México, Mexico City, Mexico. The show was the first Super Viernes show following their 2014 Infierno en el Ring show, with some matches being a follow up to storylines from that show. The main event was another chapter in the feud between the team known as Los Ingobernables (La Máscara and La Sombra) and Shocker and Último Guerrero, a storyline originally centering on Rush and Último Guerrero, but once Rush was injured the storyline became less focused on an individual feud. Los Ingobernables were joined by (at the time) unofficial Ingobernables member Marco Corleone, who was involved in a developing storyline with Thunder who teamed up with Shocker and Último Guerrero for the show. In the fifth match of the night Rey Bucanero, fresh off his win at the Infierno en el Ring main event continued his feud with Volador Jr.

December 12, 2014 Results

December 19, 2014

Mexican professional wrestling, or Lucha libre, promotion Consejo Mundial de Lucha Libre (CMLL) held their 47th CMLL Super Viernes show of 2014 on December 29, 2014 in Arena México, Mexico City, Mexico. The main event match was the continuation of a storyline that pre-dated the 2014 Infierno en el Ring show as TRT: La Máquina de la Destrucción (Rey Bucanero and El Terrible) continued their feud with Máximo and Volador Jr. for the show TRT teamed up with Shocker to defeat Máximo, Volador Jr. and Atlantis. The storyline would eventually lead to the main event of the 2015 Homenaje a Dos Leyenda.

December 19, 2014 Results

December 26, 2014

Mexican professional wrestling, or Lucha libre, promotion Consejo Mundial de Lucha Libre (CMLL) held their 48th and final CMLL Super Viernes show of 2014 on December 26, 2014 in Arena México, Mexico City, Mexico. The main focus of the show was the first round of a tournament for the vacant CMLL World Welterweight Championship. The participants were; Negro Casas, Delta, Fuego, Kamaitachi, Máscara Dorada, Pólvora, Rey Cometa, Sangre Azteca, Titán and Tritón. In the end Negro Casas and Máscara Dorada survived the elimination match and would meet on the following Super Viernes on January 2 to determine the next champion.

December 26, 2014 Results

References

2014 in professional wrestling
CMLL Super Viernes